Ios, Io or Nio (locally Nios, Νιός) is a Greek island in the Cyclades group in the Aegean Sea. Ios is a hilly island with cliffs down to the sea on most sides, situated halfway between Naxos and Santorini. Population was 2,024 in 2011 (down from 3,500 in the 19th century). Ios is part of the Thira regional unit.

Chora 

The Port of Ios is at the head of the Ormos harbour in the northwest. There is a path up the nearby hill to Chora, named after the Greek word for the main village on an island. Chora is a white and cycladic village, full of stairs and narrow paths that make it inaccessible for cars. Today, the main path through this village is completely taken over by tourism with restaurants, boutiques, bars and discothèques catering to visitors. Apart from the port and the village of Chora, Ios has a few small settlements that consist of groups of spread out houses in the background of major beaches (Theodoti, Kalamos, Manganari). Since the 1990s, the island mayor Pousseos has worked on Ios' development towards attracting different types of tourists. With the help of European Community funds some roads have been built, all of them paved, and a scenic amphitheatre was created by the German architect Peter Haupt at the top of the village hill.

Name 

According to Plutarch, it is thought that the name has derived from the Ancient Greek word for violets "Ία"(Ia) because they were commonly found on the island and it is the most accepted etymology. It is also posited that the name was derived from the Phoenician word iion, meaning “pile of stones”. Pliny the Elder also wrote that the name comes from the Ionians who lived on the island. In the Ottoman period the island was called Anza or Aina, and its present name was officially established in the 19th century after over 2000 years of usage. During the ancient times the island was also called "Φοινίκη" (Phiniki), named after and by the Phoenicians and in the 3rd century, when the island joined League of the Islanders, was likely temporarily named Arsinoe after the wife of Ptolemy II Today the inhabitants of the Cycladic Islands call the island Nio, a name deriving from the Byzantine Era. The name Little Malta, which is found in texts of travelers during the Ottoman domination, is related to the permanent presence of pirates on the island. In languages with Latin script, the island name is Nio or Io.

Geography and geology
The shape of Ios resembles a rectangle, with an average side size of 15 km (9.3 mi) and 7 km (4.3 mi) respectively. The longest axis is in the NW direction, from the Karatza cape to the
Achlades Peninsula and is 17.5 km (10.9 mi) long, while the longest axis, in the AD direction, is
14 km (8.6 mi) long. Ios has 86 km (53.4 mi) of coastline, of which 32 km (19.9 mi) are sandy beaches.

The highest elevation (723 m, 2372 ft) is the Kastro peak also called Pyrgos, located in the center
of the island, while around the Kastro are the next three
Highest peaks: Xylodema (660 m, 2165 ft), Kostiza (586 m, 1923 ft) and Prophetis Elias (490 m, 951 ft).

Ios consists almost entirely of metamorphic rocks, on
which lie limited quaternary appearances.

Plan Homer
In case of extreme events like earthquakes and wildfires, the Municipality of Ios had prepared a general plan called Homer (Greek: Όμηρος) which includes the cooperation of all Iitians.

Demographics

According to the Greek census 2011 in Ios live 2084 people, 1754 of them live in Chora.
From the 1940s to the early 1970s, the population of the island reduced consistently. The main causes of this phenomenon were the migration movement, the epidemiological conditions of the time and to a lesser extent, the loss of men aged between 18 and 45 during the war.

Food
The island is famous for its local cheeses. They are mainly made in the municipal creamery using milk from goats or sheep. The most famous one is the "skotíri" (σκοτύρι), a sour cheese with the smell of summer savory. Popular dishes of Ios are the "tsimediá" (τσιμεντιά , pumpkin flowers stuffed with rice) and "mermitzéli" (μερμιτζέλι, handmade barley).

Education
In 1827 the local leaders of Ios wrote a letter to the revolutionary government of Greece requesting a school to open in the island. During the 1850s the first school opened which housed a small number of students of all ages. The type of school that operated was called Skolarcheion (Greek: Σχολαρχείον) and was equivalent to an elementary school with some high school basic courses. Most students at the time didn't graduate as their time was occupied helping their families in the fields. This resulted in a large percentage of illiterate children. The richer families sent their children to schools of the nearby islands. From 1936 the first elementary school was founded. In 1972 the first kindergarten was opened and in 1980 the first high school that had some senior high school courses. Today, in Chora there is a kindergarten, a high school, a senior high school and an EPAL high school.

History

Prehistory

Ios from the prehistoric era and thanks to its safe natural harbour played an important role on the sea roads to Crete. The early Cycladic settlement on Skarkos hill and other prehistoric sites on the island have been found by archaeologists.

Ios was under the influence of the Minoan and then of the Mycenaean civilisation. The Phoenicians most likely arrived on the island and maintained their presence until the 9th century BC.

Ios became Ionian at some point after, as testified by its membership in the Delian Amphictyony. From 534 BC the island paid taxes to Athens.

Classical and Hellenistic times 
Ios was an important and strong city in Classical and Hellenistic times. Its decline began with the Roman occupation, when it was used as a place for exile, and continued in Byzantine times. The island experienced a recovery at the time of the Duchy of Naxos, but the Ottoman domination interrupted it. Palaiokastro, a ruined Venetian castle from the 15th century lies on the northern part of the island. Ios was important enough in the Roman province of Insulae to become a suffragan see of the Metropolis of Rhodes, but later faded and disappeared.

Numismatics

During the 3rd and 2nd century BC as Ios became part of the league of the islanders, she minted her own coins, most of them can be found in the Berlin Archaeological Museum and British Museum. There are 28 known different coins. They depict Homer, a palm tree or Athena, as she was worshiped on the island. Most of them had the writing ΙΗΤΩΝ meaning of the people of Ios.

1820s
Although Ios did not have a strong naval force, it was one of the first islands to raise the flag of revolution in when the Greek War of Independence began in 1821. Ios took part in the naval battle at Kuşadası on July 9, 1821, as well as in the Second National Assembly at Astros in 1823 and in the Third National Assembly at Troezen in 1827.

Modern times
In a modern era, the island began to emerge in the 1970s as an increasingly popular tourist destination for young people in Europe. Today Ios retains its reputation as an island of youth and entertainment, with excellent tourist infrastructure, an organised marina at its harbour and an adequate road network.

Ecclesiastically, its territory is now part of the Greek Orthodox Metropolis of Thera, Amorgos and the Islands of the Church of Greece.

Homer's death

The legend

The island is very strongly connected with Homer, because according to the legend, Homer died in Ios. Considered the greatest epic poet of the Greeks, the legend accounts that he died because he violated a Pythian oracle. According to Pausanias, Homer visited the Delphi oracle to ask Pythia about his parents and origins. Pythia replied with the oracle "Your mother's home is the island of Ios, which will accept you when you die, but you should be careful of the enigma of the young children." The poet, however, broke the oracle and traveled to Ios. There he saw some small children fishing on the coast. He asked what they had caught and the children replied: "Whatever we get we leave it and whatever we don't get we take it with us". The children were talking about lice. Those who found them, killed them, but those who did not find them, had them to their heads. Homer did not find the answer, but he remembered the warning of Pythia. He was horrified and ran away quickly. The road was muddy and the poet in his hurry slipped and fell, hitting his head and dying almost instantaneously.

According to another version, Homer died from his sadness that he did not solve the puzzle, while a third version says he was already seriously ill and went to Ios because he knew he would die. Of course, the death of Homer is not based on historical records, but on myths and traditions that circulated from oral tradition. Pausanias simply recorded a popular narrative.

Graf Pasch van Krienen expedition
In 1771, a Dutch count named Pasch di Krienen after having read the narrative, came to Ios in order to find the grave. He was informed by a local priest of the Saint Aikaterini Chapel that there is a place with marbles and some of which had inscriptions. He was told that they were constructed long after Homer's death but he persisted and with the help of Spyridon Valetas he found three graves and the last one had inscriptions about Homer including Ενθάδε την ιερήν κεφαλήν κατά γαία καλύπτει ανδρών ηρώων κοσμήτορα θείον Όμηρον which means here under the earth lies the sacred head of heroic Homer. When he found this, Pasch was sure that the grave belonged to the epic poet but he realised some grammatical mistakes on the gravestone and he began doubting its authenticity. After having spent considerable time and money, he decided to give up after having also found two graves at Agia Theodoti

Beaches 
Ios attracts a large number of young tourists, many of whom used to sleep on their sleeping bags during the 1970s on the popular beach of Mylopotas after partying through the night. Today Mylopotas beach has been developed to an equivalent mass package tourism resort like Platys Gialos and Paradise Beach of Mykonos.

Climate
Ios has a warm-summer Mediterranean climate with mild winters and pleasant summers. Similar to other Cyclades islands, there is an almost constant breeze from the north during summer, known as meltemi, which moderates temperatures.

Timeline

Notable people

Ancient
 Critheïs, mother of Homer

Modern
 Spyridon Valetas (1779–1843), scholar, member of Filiki Eteria
 Lakis Nikolaou (1949– ), footballer
 Jean-Marie Drot (1929-2015), writer and cinematographer who loved the island and also founded The Jean Marie Drot Museum in Ios

Gallery

References

External links 

 
 Municipality of Ios 

 
Municipalities of the South Aegean
Ios, Diocese
Ios, Diocese
Populated places in Thira (regional unit)
Landforms of Thira (regional unit)
Islands of the South Aegean
Members of the Delian League
Greek city-states
Populated places in the ancient Aegean islands